Offa's Dyke is a large linear earthwork that roughly follows the border between England and Wales. The structure is named after Offa, the Anglo-Saxon king of Mercia from AD 757 until 796, who is traditionally believed to have ordered its construction. Although its precise original purpose is debated, it delineated the border between Anglian Mercia and the Welsh kingdom of Powys.

Today it is protected as a scheduled monument.

Although the Dyke has conventionally been dated to the Early Middle Ages of Anglo-Saxon England, research in recent decades – using techniques such as radioactive carbon dating – has challenged the conventional historiography and theories about the earthwork and shows that part was started in the early 5th century, during the sub-Roman period.

History

Background

The generally accepted theory of the earthwork attributes most of its construction to Offa, King of Mercia from 757 to 796. The structure did not represent a mutually agreed boundary between the Mercians and the Kingdom of Powys. It had a ditch on the Welsh (western) side, with the displaced soil piled into a bank on the Mercian (eastern) side. This suggests that Mercians constructed it as a defensive earthwork, or to demonstrate the power and intent of their kingdom.

Throughout its entire length, the Dyke provides an uninterrupted view from Mercia into Wales. Where the earthwork encounters hills or high ground, it passes to the west of them.

Although historians often overlook Offa's reign because of limitations in source material, he ranks as one of the greatest Anglo-Saxon rulers – as evidenced in his ability to raise the workforce and resources required to construct Offa's Dyke. The construction of the earthwork probably involved a corvée system requiring  vassals to build certain lengths of the earthwork for Offa in addition to performing their normal services to their king. The Tribal Hidage, a primary document, shows the distribution of land within 8th-century Britain; it shows that peoples were located within specified territories for administration.

Early scholarship

The first historians and archaeologists to examine the Dyke seriously compared their conclusions with the late 9th-century writer Asser, who wrote: "there was in Mercia in fairly recent time a certain vigorous king called Offa, who terrified all the neighbouring kings and provinces around him, and who had a great dyke built between Wales and Mercia from sea to sea". In 1955, Sir Cyril Fox published the first major survey of the Dyke. Although Fox observed that Offa's Dyke was not a continuous linear structure, he concluded that earthworks were raised in only those areas where natural barriers did not already exist.

Sir Frank Stenton, the UK's most eminent 20th-century scholar on Anglo-Saxon England, accepted Fox's conclusions. He wrote the introduction to Fox's account of the Dyke. Although Fox's work has now been revised to some extent, it still remains a vital record of some stretches of Offa's Dyke that still existed between 1926 and 1928, when his three field surveys took place, but have since been destroyed.

Later research 
In 1978, Dr Frank Noble challenged some of Fox's conclusions, stirring up new academic interest in Offa's Dyke. His MPhil thesis entitled "Offa's Dyke Reviewed" (1978) raised several questions concerning the accepted historiography of Offa's Dyke. Noble postulated that the gaps in the Dyke were not due to the incorporation of natural features as defensive barriers, but instead the gaps were a "ridden boundary", perhaps incorporating palisades, that left no archaeological trace.  Noble also helped establish the Offa's Dyke Association, which maintains the Offa's Dyke Path. This long-distance footpath mostly follows the route of the dyke and is a designated British National Trail.

John Davies wrote of Fox's study: "In the planning of it, there was a degree of consultation with the kings of Powys and Gwent. On the Long Mountain near Trelystan, the dyke veers to the east, leaving the fertile slopes in the hands of the Welsh; near Rhiwabon, it was designed to ensure that Cadell ap Brochwel retained possession of the Fortress of Penygadden." And, for Gwent, Offa had the dyke built "on the eastern crest of the gorge, clearly with the intention of recognizing that the River Wye and its traffic belonged to the kingdom of Gwent".

Ongoing research and archaeology on Offa's Dyke has been undertaken for many years by the Extra-Mural Department of the University of Manchester. Interviews with Dr David Hill, broadcast in episode 1 of In Search of the Dark Ages (aired in 1979), show support for Noble's idea. Most recently, Hill and Margaret Worthington have undertaken considerable research on the Dyke. Their work, though far from finished, has demonstrated that there is little evidence for the Dyke stretching from sea to sea. Rather, they claim that it is a shorter structure stretching from Rushock Hill north of the Herefordshire Plain to Llanfynydd, near Mold, Flintshire, some 64 miles (103 km). According to Hill and Worthington, dykes in the far north and south may have different dates, and though they may be connected with Offa's Dyke, there is as yet no compelling evidence behind this. However, not all experts accept this view.

Contrary evidence
'Ofer' means 'border' or 'edge' in Old English, giving rise to the possibility of alternative derivations for some border features associated with Offa.

The Roman historian Eutropius in his book Historiae Romanae Breviarium, written around 369, mentions the Wall of Severus, a structure built by Septimius Severus, who was Roman Emperor between 193 and 211:
Novissimum bellum in Britannia habuit, utque receptas provincias omni securitate muniret, vallum per CXXXIII passuum milia a mari ad mare deduxit. Decessit Eboraci admodum senex, imperii anno sexto decimo, mense tertio. Historiae Romanae Breviarium, viii 19.1

He had his most recent war in Britain, and to fortify the conquered provinces with all security, he built a wall for 133 miles from sea to sea. He died at York, a reasonably old man, in the sixteenth year and third month of his reign.
This source is conventionally thought to be referring, in error, to either Hadrian's Wall, or the Antonine Wall, which were both shorter and built in the 2nd century. Recently, some writers have suggested that Eutropius may have been referring to the earthwork later called Offa's Dyke. Most archaeologists reject this theory.

The Venerable Bede also mentions the barrier built by Septimus Severus, but Bede says that the rampart was made of earth and timber, a description which would closer match Offa's Dyke than Hadrian's Wall, though it would describe the Antonine Wall:
After many great and severe battles, (Severus) thought fit to divide that part of the island, which he had recovered, from the other unconquered nations, not with a wall, as some imagine, but with a rampart. For a wall is made of stones, but a rampart, with which camps are fortified to repel the assaults of enemies, is made of sods, cut out of the earth, and raised high above the ground, like a wall, having in front of it the trench whence the sods were taken, with strong stakes of wood fixed above it. Thus Severus drew a great trench and strong rampart, fortified with several towers, from sea to sea. Bede’s Ecclesiastical History of England, Bk 1-5

However, the solution to the problem lies a few chapters later in Bede's account. In Book One Chapter Twelve of Bede's Ecclesiastical History, he writes that the Romans "built a strong wall of stone directly from sea to sea in a straight line between the towns that had been built as strong-points, where Severus had built his earthwork ... straight from east to west". The strong wall of stone cannot refer to the Antonine Wall or Offa's Dyke, so it clearly refers to Hadrian's Wall, especially as Offa's Dyke runs from north to south. Also, as Severus's earthwork is described as being in the same location as Hadrian's Wall, it cannot be Offa's Dyke either, so the earth rampart with a great trench that Bede refers to must be the Vallum, the adjoining earthen barrier immediately south of Hadrian's Wall. Where Bede got it wrong was in attributing the Vallum to Septimius Severus, and saying that it predated the Wall. In fact the Vallum was the work of Hadrian, and slightly post-dated the Wall.

Evidence has also been found that challenges the accepted date of the construction of Offa's Dyke. In December 1999, Shropshire County Council archaeologists uncovered the remains of a hearth or fire on the original ground surface beneath Wat's Dyke near Oswestry. Carbon dating analysis of the burnt charcoal and burnt clay in situ showed it was covered by earth on or around AD 446. Archaeologists concluded that this part of Wat's Dyke, so long thought of as Anglo-Saxon and a mid-8th-century contemporary of Offa's Dyke, must have been built 300 years earlier in the post-Roman period.

In 2014, excavations by the Clwyd-Powys Archaeological Trust focused on nine samples of the Dyke near Chirk. Radiocarbon dating of redeposited turf resulted in a series of dates. In one section, these ranged from AD 430 to AD 652 and in another section from AD 887 to AD 1019: confirming that the bank is clearly post-Roman, and that at least some rebuilding work took place after Offa's reign. It has been suggested that Offa's Dyke may have been a long-term project by several Mercian kings. Further excavations by Clwyd-Powys Archaeological Trust on the Dyke at Chirk Castle found well-preserved remains of the ditch under later parkland; radiocarbon samples were recovered, but the results have not yet been made public.

Current
The England–Wales border still mostly passes within a few miles of the course of Offa's Dyke through the Welsh Marches. A  section of the Dyke which overlooks Tintern Abbey and includes the Devil's Pulpit near Chepstow is now managed by English Heritage.

Statutory protection
All sections of Offa's Dyke that survive as visible earthworks, or as infilled but undeveloped ditch, are designated as a scheduled monument. However, some parts of the Dyke may also remain buried under later development.  Some sections are also defined as Sites of Special Scientific Interest, including stretches within the Lower Wye Valley SSSI and the Highbury Wood National Nature Reserve.  Parts are located within the Wye Valley and Shropshire Hills Areas of Outstanding Natural Beauty.  Most of the line of Offa's Dyke is designated as a public right of way, including those sections which form part of the Offa's Dyke Path.

In August 2013, a  section of Dyke, between Chirk and Llangollen, was destroyed by a local landowner. The destruction of the Dyke to build a stable was said to be like "driving a road through Stonehenge", but the perpetrator escaped punishment.

Candidate World Heritage Site
In 2010, the Dyke was proposed by the Offa's Dyke Association and local authorities for World Heritage Site status.  Part of the proposal stated:

The proposal was rejected in 2011.

The Offa's Dyke Centre
The Offa's Dyke Centre is a purpose-built information centre in the town of Knighton, on Offa's Dyke on the border between England (Shropshire) and Wales (Powys). Some of the best remains of the earthworks can be seen within a two-minute walk from the centre.

Offa's Dyke Path

The Offa's Dyke Path (Welsh: Llwybr Clawdd Offa) is a long-distance footpath close to the England–Wales border. Although large sections are close to the Dyke itself, the Path is longer, and in some places passes at some distance from the earthworks. There is a visitor centre at Knighton.

Cultural importance
The dyke has a cultural significance symbolising the separation between England and Wales: a symbolism similar to Hadrian's Wall between England and Scotland in the Scottish Marches. George Borrow, in his Wild Wales (1862), drawn from folklore, claimed that:

See also
 England–Wales border
 Welsh Marches
 Hadrian's Wall
 Wansdyke
 Danevirke (contemporary Danish dyke)

References

Bibliography
Cyril Fox, Offa's Dyke: a Field Survey of the Western Frontier Works of Mercia in the Seventh and Eighth Centuries AD (London, 1955)
David Hill and Margaret Worthington, Offa's Dyke: History and Guide (Stroud, 2003)
Frank Noble, Offa's Dyke Reviewed, MPhil thesis Open University (1978). Partly published in Offa's Dyke Reviewed, ed. Margaret Gelling (Oxford, 1983)
Tyler, D.J. "Offa’s Dyke: a historiographical appraisal," Journal of Medieval History (2011) 37#2 pp  145–161

External links 

Offa's Dyke Association website 
Clwyd-Powys Archaeological Trust: Introducing Offa's Dyke
How Offa's Dyke created a genetic barrier between the English and the Welsh BBC Gene Stories article
 History Offa's Dyke; English Heritage

Anglo-Saxon sites in England
Anglo-Saxon sites in Wales
Archaeological sites in Powys
English Heritage sites in Gloucestershire
Fortification lines
History of Shropshire
Ruins in England
Ruins in Wales
Ancient dikes
England–Wales border
History of Powys
Fortifications in Wales
Fortifications in England
Scheduled monuments in Flintshire
Linear earthworks